Delta Force: Task Force Dagger is a first-person shooter video game developed by Zombie Studios and published by NovaLogic. It's a stand-alone expansion pack to Delta Force: Land Warrior. It is set in Afghanistan in 2002.

Gameplay 
Task Force Dagger is based on the same engine as the previous Delta Force title, Land Warrior, and retains all of its gameplay mechanics. The largest difference is that the player can now choose to control a character from either one of ten available special operation units, including SEAL Team Six, the Green Berets and the Special Air Service. All of these have individual advantages and disadvantages, such as some operatives being formidable snipers while others are able to sustain larger amounts of damage. However, mechanically these factions are identical to the different playable Delta Force operatives available in Land Warrior. Unlike the earlier games, Task Force Dagger usually sends the player on missions alone, without any support from AI-controlled friendly soldiers.

Like all earlier Delta Force titles, Task Force Dagger has a larger focus on realism than is common in the first person shooter genre. Most of the gameplay takes place in large outdoor environments with combat distances of up to several hundred meters, and bullet ballistics have to be taken into account when aiming at distant targets. Typically for the series, characters usually die from a single hit. Like Land Warrior, Task Force Dagger also prominently features combat in narrow tunnels.

As before, the missions are comparably open-ended, only requiring the player to fulfill specific objectives while allowing him to manoeuvre freely on the maps. Objectives usually involve eliminating all hostile presence in an area or destroying military equipment such as SCUD launchers and ammunition depots. Before each mission the player is able to customise their weapon loadout but can later replace weapons with ones dropped by killed characters or access weapons caches to re-equip himself on-mission.

Map editor
The game package includes a Mission Editor that gives the player the ability to create their own singleplayer or multiplayer maps for other users to play in.

Reception

The game received "mixed" reviews according to video game review aggregator Metacritic.

References

External links 

2002 video games
Cooperative video games
Delta Force (video game series)
First-person shooters
Tactical shooter video games
Video game expansion packs
Video games about Delta Force
Video games about the Special Air Service
Video games about the United States Navy SEALs
Video games developed in the United States
Video games set in Afghanistan
War in Afghanistan (2001–2021) video games
Windows games
Windows-only games
Zombie Studios games
NovaLogic games